Steve Whitfield (born 21 November 1950) is an Australian cricketer. He played three first-class matches for New South Wales in 1988/89.

See also
 List of New South Wales representative cricketers

References

External links
 

1950 births
Living people
Australian cricketers
New South Wales cricketers
Cricketers from Sydney